= Willem Hoornstra =

Dutch politician

Willem Hoornstra (born 19 February 1948 in Zwolle) is a Dutch politician.
